Hanu (also called Hanoo) is a village panchayat in the Khalsi tehsil in the Leh district of Ladakh, India. It is one of the main Brokpa villages in Ladakh. It is in the valley of the Hanu stream that flows from the Chorbat La pass to drain into the Indus river.

Geography
Hanu consists of two villages — Yogma Hanu (Lower Hanu) and Goma Hanu (Upper Hanu) — which lie in the eponymous valley, running between the Chorbat La pass and the Indus River valley near Dah. The Hanu stream flows down the valley and joins the Indus. To the north of the Chorbat La pass, the Chorbat Lungpa river flows north to join the Shyok river near Hassanabad Chorbat.

History 
The Chorbat La pass is considered the traditional boundary between Baltistan and Ladakh. According to geographer Frederick Drew, the valleys of Chorbat Lungpa and Hanu constituted the main route from Baltistan to Ladakh in the past. The two villages Goma Hanu and Yogma Hanu are fortified, indicating that they experienced raids from Baltistan in the past.

Demographics 
According to the 2011 census of India, Hanoo has a population of 1207 across 224 households. The literacy rate is 47.69%.

See also
Dah
Garkon
Darchik
Chulichan

References

 Sources
 

Villages in Khalsi tehsil